Julen Irizar Laskurain (born 26 March 1995) is a Spanish cyclist, who ccompeted as a professional from 2017 to 2022.

Major results
2018
 1st Stage 2 Grande Prémio de Portugal N2

References

External links

1995 births
Living people
Spanish male cyclists
Cyclists from the Basque Country (autonomous community)
People from Bergara
Sportspeople from Gipuzkoa